The 2012–13 NBA season was the Bucks' 45th season in the NBA. The Bucks finished 38-44 and in eighth place in the Eastern Conference in the regular season. They were swept by the eventual back-to-back NBA champion Miami Heat in the first round of the 2013 NBA Playoffs.

Draft picks

Roster

Pre-season

|- bgcolor=#cfc
| 1
| October 9
| @ Cleveland
| 
| C. J. Miles (18)
| Larry Sanders (8)
| Brandon Jennings (7)
| Canton Memorial Civic Center3,942
| 1–0
|- bgcolor=#cfc
| 2
| October 13
| Detroit
| 
| Ersan İlyasova (22)
| Ersan İlyasova (7)
| Brandon Jennings (6)
| BMO Harris Bradley Center5,213
| 2–0
|- bgcolor=#fcc
| 3
| October 16
| @ Chicago
| 
| Three players (13)
| Samuel Dalembert (10)
| Four players (3)
| United Center21,073
| 2–1
|- bgcolor=#fcc
| 4
| October 18
| Memphis
| 
| Monta Ellis (20)
| Larry Sanders (8)
| Beno Udrih (6)
| La Crosse Center4,314
| 2–2
|- bgcolor=#fcc
| 5
| October 20
| Washington
| 
| Monta Ellis (19)
| Ersan İlyasova (8)
| Monta Ellis (8)
| BMO Harris Bradley Center9,967
| 2–3
|- bgcolor=#fcc
| 6
| October 22
| @ Toronto
| 
| Monta Ellis (26)
| Samuel Dalembert (11)
| Brandon Jennings (10)
| Air Canada Centre11,364
| 2–4
|- bgcolor=#cfc
| 7
| October 25
| @ Charlotte
| 
| Tobias Harris (18)
| Larry Sanders (13)
| Ersan İlyasova, Beno Udrih (6)
| Time Warner Cable Arena19,077
| 3–4
|- bgcolor=#fcc
| 8
| October 26
| Minnesota
| 
| Brandon Jennings (19)
| Ersan İlyasova (6)
| Four players (3)
| Resch Center4,165
| 3–5

Regular season

Game log

|- style="background:#cfc;"
| 1 || November 2 || @ Boston
| 
| Brandon Jennings (21)
| Ersan İlyasova (11)
| Brandon Jennings (13)
| TD Garden18,624
| 1-0       
|- style="background:#cfc;"
     
| 2 || November 3 || Cleveland
| 
| Mike Dunleavy (29)
| Mike Dunleavy (12)
| Brandon Jennings (13)
| BMO Harris Bradley Center17,086
| 2-0       
|- style="background:#fcc;"        
| 3 || November 7 || Memphis
| 
| Brandon Jennings (19)
| Larry Sanders (11)
| Monta Ellis (7)
| BMO Harris Bradley Center11,465
| 2-1       
|- style="background:#cfc;"        
| 4 || November 9 || @ Washington
| 
| Monta Ellis (22)
| Dunleavy & Sanders (9)
| Brandon Jennings (7)
| Verizon Center14,531
| 3-1       
|- style="background:#fcc;"        
| 5  || November 10 || Boston
| 
| Monta Ellis (32)
| Larry Sanders (12)
| Monta Ellis (8)
| BMO Harris Bradley Center14,589
| 3-2       
|- style="background:#cfc;"        
| 6  || November 12 || @ Philadelphia
| 
| Brandon Jennings (33)
| Larry Sanders (9)
| Brandon Jennings (8)
| Wells Fargo Center15,086
| 4-2       
|- style="background:#cfc;"        
| 7  || November 14 || Indiana
| 
| Ellis & Jennings (16)
| Ekpe Udoh (7)
| Beno Udrih (10)
| BMO Harris Bradley Center11,573
| 5-2       
|- style="background:#cfc;"        
| 8 || November 17 || New Orleans
| 
| Ellis & Jennings (22)
| Mike Dunleavy (9)
| Ellis & Jennings (9)
| BMO Harris Bradley Center14,731
| 6-2       
|- style="background:#fcc;"        
| 9 || November 19 || @ Charlotte
| 
| Monta Ellis (31)
| Ekpe Udoh (6)
| Beno Udrih (7)
| Time Warner Cable Arena11,248
| 6-3       
|- style="background:#fcc;"        
| 10 || November 21 || @ Miami
| 
| Brandon Jennings (19)
| John Henson (18)
| Brandon Jennings (6)
| American Airlines Arena19,971
| 6-4       
|- style="background:#fcc;"        
| 11 || November 24 || Chicago
| 
| Brandon Jennings (23)
| Sanders & Udoh (8)
| Brandon Jennings (7)
| BMO Harris Bradley Center14,812
| 6-5       
|- style="background:#cfc;"        
| 12 || November 26 || @ Chicago
| 
| Ersan İlyasova (18)
| Ilyasova, Sanders,& Udoh (6)
| Beno Udrih (6)
| United Center21,485
| 7-5       
|- style="background:#fcc;"        
| 13 || November 28 || New York
| 
| Jennings & Udrih (18)
| Mike Dunleavy (9)
| Monta Ellis (7)
| BMO Harris Bradley Center11,439
| 7-6     
|- style="background:#fcc;"       
| 14 || November 30 || @ Minnesota
| 
| Ellis & Jennings (18)
| Larry Sanders (12)
| Brandon Jennings (4)
| BMO Harris Bradley Center16,418
| 7-7
|- bgcolor="#ccffcc"

|- style="background:#cfc;"   
| 15 || December 1 || Boston
| 
| Larry Sanders (18)
| Larry Sanders (16)
| Monta Ellis (7)
| BMO Harris Bradley Center16,581
| 8-7       
|- style="background:#fcc;"       
| 16 || December 3 || @ New Orleans
| 
| Brandon Jennings (25)
| Luc Richard Mbah a Moute (8)
| Monta Ellis (6)
| New Orleans Arena12,321
| 8-8       
|- style="background:#fcc;"       
| 17 || December 5 || @ San Antonio
| 
| Monta Ellis (21)
| Ellis & Sanders (7)
| Monta Ellis (11)
| AT&T Center18,349
| 8-9       
|- style="background:#cfc;"
| 18 || December 7 || Charlotte
| 
| Ersan İlyasova (21)
| Ersan İlyasova (12)
| Brandon Jennings (8)
| BMO Harris Bradley Center13,371
| 9-9       
|- style="background:#cfc;"       
| 19 || December 9 || @ Brooklyn
| 
| Brandon Jennings (26)
| Marquis Daniels (7)
| Brandon Jennings (7)
| Barclays Center16,390
| 10-9      
|- style="background:#cfc;"
| 20 || December 12 || Sacramento
| 
| Brandon Jennings (19)
| Ersan İlyasova (14)
| Monta Ellis (11)
| BMO Harris Bradley Center11,491
| 11-9
|- style="background:#cfc;"       
| 21 || December 14 || @ Cleveland
| 
| Monta Ellis (33)
| Larry Sanders (10)
| Brandon Jennings (8)
| Quicken Loans Arena14,146
| 12-9       
|- style="background:#fcc;"       
| 22 || December 15 || L. A. Clippers
| 
| Marquis Daniels (16)
| Luc Richard Mbah a Moute (6)
| Monta Ellis (4)
| BMO Harris Bradley Center13,691
| 12-10       
|- style="background:#cfc;"       
| 23 || December 18 || Indiana
| 
| Brandon Jennings (34)
| Luc Richard Mbah a Moute (10)
| Ellis & Jennings (6)
| BMO Harris Bradley Center11,739
| 13-10       
|- style="background:#fcc;"       
| 24 || December 19 || @ Memphis
| 
| Brandon Jennings (26)
| Larry Sanders (9)
| Mike Dunleavy (3)
| FedExForum16,007
| 13-11       
|- style="background:#cfc;"       
| 25 || December 21 || @ Boston
| 
| Monta Ellis (27)
| Larry Sanders (20)
| Brandon Jennings (8)
| TD Garden18,624
| 14-11       
|- style="background:#fcc;"       
| 26 || December 22 || Cleveland
| 
| Monta Ellis (37)
| Larry Sanders (12)
| Dunleavy & Mbah a Moute (4)
| BMO Harris Bradley Center14,176
| 14-12       
|- style="background:#cfc;"       
| 27 || December 26 || Brooklyn
| 
| Brandon Jennings (25)
| Larry Sanders (12)
| Monta Ellis (7)
| BMO Harris Bradley Center13,102
| 15-12       
|- style="background:#cfc;"      
| 28 || December 29 || Miami
| 
| Brandon Jennings (25)
| Larry Sanders (11)
| Monta Ellis (9)
| BMO Harris Bradley Center18,717
| 16-12       
|- style="background:#fcc;"       
| 29 || December 30 || @ Detroit
| 
| Monta Ellis (30)
| Daniels & Jennings (6)
| Monta Ellis (9)
| The Palace of Auburn Hills14,219
| 16-13
   
|- style="background:#fcc;"        
| 30 || January 2 || San Antonio
| 
| Brandon Jennings (31)
| Ersan İlyasova (10)
| Monta Ellis (8)
| BMO Harris Bradley Center15,084
| 16-14       
|- style="background:#fcc;"       
| 31 || January 4 || Houston
| 
| Brandon Jennings (16)
| John Henson (15)
| Ellis & Jennings (7)
| BMO Harris Bradley Center15,867
| 16-15       
|- style="background:#fcc;"       
| 32 || January 5 || @ Indiana
| 
| Monta Ellis (21)
| John Henson (13)
| Jennings & Udrih (5)
| Bankers Life Fieldhouse15,329
| 16-16       
|- style="background:#cfc;"       
| 33 || January 8 || Phoenix
| 
| Brandon Jennings (29)
| John Henson (11)
| Brandon Jennings (9)
| BMO Harris Bradley Center13,014
| 17-16       
|- style="background:#cfc;"       
| 34 || January 9 || @ Chicago
| 
| Brandon Jennings (35)
| Larry Sanders (12)
| Brandon Jennings (6)
| United Center21,570
| 18-16       
|- style="background:#fcc;"       
| 35 || January 11 || Detroit
| 
| Jennings & Udrih (15)
| Samuel Dalembert (7)
| Monta Ellis (5)
| BMO Harris Bradley Center15,681
| 18-17       
|- style="background:#cfc;"       
| 36 || January 13 || @ Toronto
| 
| Henson & Jennings (19)
| Larry Sanders (8)
| Brandon Jennings (10)
| Air Canada Centre17,384
| 19-17       
|- style="background:#fcc;"       
| 37 || January 15 || @ L. A. Lakers
| 
| Monta Ellis (17)
| Larry Sanders (11)
| Beno Udrih (7)
| Staples Center18,997
| 19-18       
|- style="background:#cfc;"       
| 38 || January 17 || @ Phoenix
| 
| Monta Ellis (24)
| Larry Sanders (15)
| Ellis & Udrih (6)
| US Airways Center15,963
| 20-18       
|- style="background:#cfc;"       
| 39 || January 19 || @ Portland
| 
| Brandon Jennings (30)
| Ersan İlyasova (14)
| Brandon Jennings (8)
| Rose Garden20,487
| 21-18       
|- style="background:#cfc;"      
| 40 || January 22 || Philadelphia
| 
| Ersan İlyasova (27)
| Ersan İlyasova (16)
| Monta Ellis (10)
| BMO Harris Bradley Center13,080
| 22-18      
|- style="background:#fcc;"       
| 41 || January 25 || @ Cleveland
| 
| Ersan İlyasova (30)
| Larry Sanders (11)
| Brandon Jennings (12)
| Quicken Loans Arena15,098
| 22-19       
|- style="background:#cfc;"       
| 42 || January 26 || Golden State
| 
| Ellis & Jennings (20)
| Ersan İlyasova (12)
| Brandon Jennings (7)
| BMO Harris Bradley Center16,937
| 23-19       
|- style="background:#cfc;"       
| 43 || January 29 || @ Detroit
| 
| Brandon Jennings (30)
| Samuel Dalembert (10)
| Beno Udrih (11)
| The Palace of Auburn Hills15,479
| 24-19       
|- style="background:#fcc;"       
| 44 || January 30 || Chicago
| 
| Ersan İlyasova (18)
| Samuel Dalembert (13)
| Brandon Jennings (8)
| BMO Harris Bradley Center17,640
| 24-20
   
|- style="background:#fcc;"       
| 45 || February 1 || @ New York
| 
| Ersan İlyasova (19)
| Larry Sanders (10)
| Brandon Jennings (6)
| Madison Square Garden19,033
| 24-21       
|- style="background:#cfc;"       
| 46 || February 2 || Orlando
| 
| Monta Ellis (21)
| Larry Sanders (13)
| Monta Ellis (11)
| BMO Harris Bradley Center14,321
| 25-21       
|- style="background:#fcc;"       
| 47 || February 5 || @ Denver
| 
| Samuel Dalembert (35)
| Samuel Dalembert (12)
| Brandon Jennings (10)
| Pepsi Center15,272
| 25-22       
|- style="background:#fcc;"       
| 48 || February 6 || @ Utah
| 
| Ilyasova & Jennings (17)
| Samuel Dalembert (11)
| Monta Ellis (5)
| EnergySolutions Arena18,571
| 25-23
|- style="background:#fcc;"
| 49 || February 9 || Detroit
| 
| Brandon Jennings (26)
| Samuel Dalembert (12)
| Brandon Jennings (7)
| BMO Harris Bradley Center15,511
| 25-24
|- style="background:#fcc;"
| 50 || February 11 || Washington
| 
| Monta Ellis (24)
| Ersan İlyasova (9)
| Monta Ellis (8)
| BMO Harris Bradley Center13,842
| 25-25
|- style="background:#cfc;"
| 51 || February 13 || Philadelphia
| 
| Monta Ellis (27)
| Samuel Dalembert (14)
| Ellis & Jennings (5)
| BMO Harris Bradley Center15,114
| 26-25
|- align="center"
|colspan="9" bgcolor="#bbcaff"|All-Star Break
|- style="background:#fcc;"       
| 52 || February 19 || @ Brooklyn
| 
| Brandon Jennings (34)
| Ersan İlyasova (9)
| Monta Ellis (8)
| Barclays Center17,334
| 26-26
|- style="background:#fcc;"
| 53 || February 20 || Brooklyn
| 
| Brandon Jennings (31)
| Larry Sanders (13)
| Brandon Jennings (11)
| BMO Harris Bradley Center14,563
| 26-27
|- style="background:#fcc;"
| 54 || February 23 || Atlanta
| 
| Ersan İlyasova (19)
| Larry Sanders (19)
| Monta Ellis (10)
| BMO Harris Bradley Center18,289
| 26-28
|- style="background:#cfc;"
| 55 || February 26 || @ Dallas
| 
| Monta Ellis (22)
| Larry Sanders (13)
| Monta Ellis (9)
| American Airlines Center19,870
| 27-28
|- style="background:#cfc;"
| 56 || February 27 || @ Houston
| 
| Monta Ellis (27)
| Ersan İlyasova (10)
| Monta Ellis (13)
| Toyota Center15,463
| 28-28
   
|- style="background:#cfc;"
| 57 || March 2 || Toronto
| 
| Ersan İlyasova (29)
| Larry Sanders (12)
| Brandon Jennings (19)
| BMO Harris Bradley Center16,165
| 29-28
|- style="background:#cfc;"
| 58 || March 4 || Utah
| 
| Monta Ellis (34)
| Larry Sanders (16)
| Brandon Jennings (17)
| BMO Harris Bradley Center13,926
| 30-28
|- style="background:#fcc;"
| 59 || March 6 || @ L. A. Clippers
| 
| Monta Ellis (22)
| Henson & Sanders (7)
| Brandon Jennings (12)
| Staples Center19,060
| 30-29
|- style="background:#cfc;"
| 60 || March 9 || @ Golden State
| 
| Brandon Jennings (31)
| Larry Sanders (9)
| Brandon Jennings (10)
| Oracle Arena19,596
| 31-29
|- style="background:#cfc;"
| 61 || March 10 || @ Sacramento
| 
| Monta Ellis (29)
| Samuel Dalembert (11)
| Monta Ellis (9)
| Power Balance Pavilion14,761
| 32-29
|- style="background:#fcc;"
| 62 || March 12 || Dallas
| 
| Monta Ellis (32)
| Larry Sanders (12)
| Monta Ellis (9)
| BMO Harris Bradley Center14,154
| 32-30
|- style="background:#fcc;"
| 63 || March 13 || @ Washington
| 
| Monta Ellis (26)
| Ersan İlyasova (12)
| Brandon Jennings (10)
| Verizon Center14,506
| 32-31
|- style="background:#fcc;"
| 64 || March 15 || Miami
| 
| Ersan İlyasova (26)
| Ersan İlyasova (17)
| Monta Ellis (7)
| BMO Harris Bradley Center18,717
| 32-32
|- style="background:#cfc;"
| 65 || March 17 || Orlando
| 
| Monta Ellis (39)
| Ersan İlyasova (11)
| Brandon Jennings (14)
| BMO Harris Bradley Center15,591
| 33-32
|- style="background:#cfc;"
| 66 || March 19 || Portland
| 
| Brandon Jennings (24)
| Larry Sanders (13)
| Monta Ellis (8)
| BMO Harris Bradley Center14,397
| 34-32
|- style="background:#fcc;"
| 67 || March 20 || @ Atlanta
| 
| Brandon Jennings (21)
| Larry Sanders (14)
| JJ Redick (6)
| Philips Arena11,920
| 34-33
|- style="background:#fcc;"
| 68 || March 22 || @ Indiana
| 
| Monta Ellis (22)
| Samuel Dalembert (13)
| Monta Ellis (6)
| Bankers Life Fieldhouse18,165
| 34-34
|- style="background:#fcc;"
| 69 || March 24 || Atlanta
| 
| Monta Ellis (20)
| Larry Sanders (12)
| Brandon Jennings (13)
| BMO Harris Bradley Center17,587
| 34-35
|- style="background:#fcc;"
| 70 || March 27 || @ Philadelphia
| 
| Monta Ellis (29)
| Ersan İlyasova (18)
| Monta Ellis (7)
| Wells Fargo Center16,640
| 34-36
|- style="background:#cfc;"
| 71 || March 28 || L. A. Lakers
| 
| Larry Sanders (21)
| Larry Sanders (13)
| Monta Ellis (9)
| BMO Harris Bradley Center16,884
| 35-36
|- style="background:#fcc;"
| 72 || March 30 || Oklahoma City
| 
| Ersan İlyasova (29)
| Ersan İlyasova (14)
| Monta Ellis (7)
| BMO Harris Bradley Center17,578
| 35-37
   
|- style="background:#cfc;"
| 73 || April 1 || Charlotte
| 
| Larry Sanders (24)
| Larry Sanders (13)
| Monta Ellis (14)
| BMO Harris Bradley Center15,315
| 36-37
|- style="background:#fcc;"
| 74 || April 3 || Minnesota
| 
| Ersan İlyasova (29)
| Ersan İlyasova (12)
| Brandon Jennings (8)
| BMO Harris Bradley Center15,386
| 36-38
|- style="background:#fcc;"
| 75 || April 5 || @ New York
| 
| Brandon Jennings (25)
| Larry Sanders (12)
| Monta Ellis (6)
| Madison Square Garden19,033
| 36-39
|- style="background:#cfc;"
| 76 || April 6 || Toronto
| 
| Monta Ellis (22)
| Larry Sanders (9)
| Monta Ellis (9)
| BMO Harris Bradley Center16,746
| 37-39
|- style="background:#fcc;"
| 77 || April 9 || @ Miami
| 
| Brandon Jennings (30)
| Larry Sanders (9)
| Brandon Jennings (4)
| American Airlines Arena19,834
| 37-40
|- style="background:#fcc;"
| 78 || April 10 || @ Orlando
| 
| Monta Ellis (21)
| John Henson (25)
| Monta Ellis (11)
| Amway Center17,127
| 37-41
|- style="background:#fcc;"
| 79 || April 12 || @ Atlanta
| 
| Monta Ellis (27)
| Ekpe Udoh (9)
| Monta Ellis (17)
| Philips Arena16,908
| 37-42
|- style="background:#fcc;"
| 80 || April 13 || @ Charlotte
| 
| Mike Dunleavy (19)
| John Henson (11)
| Ish Smith (7)
| Time Warner Cable Arena14,680
| 37-43
|- style="background:#fcc;"
| 81 || April 15 || Denver
| 
| Monta Ellis (38)
| John Henson (15)
| Ish Smith (6)
| BMO Harris Bradley Center16,517
| 37-44
|- style="background:#cfc;"
| 82 || April 17 || @ Oklahoma City
| 
| John Henson (28)
| John Henson (16)
| Ish Smith (5)
| Chesapeake Energy Arena18,203
| 38-44

Standings

Playoffs

|- style="background:#fcc;"
| 1
| April 21
| @ Miami
| 
| Brandon Jennings (26)
| Ersan İlyasova (6)
| Monta Ellis & JJ Redick (3)
| American Airlines Arena20,006
| 0-1
|- style="background:#fcc;"
| 2
| April 23
| @ Miami
| 
| Ersan İlyasova (21)
| Mike Dunleavy, Jr., Ersan İlyasova, & Larry Sanders (6)
| Mike Dunleavy, Jr., Monta Ellis, & Brandon Jennings (5)
| American Airlines Arena20,097
| 0-2
|- style="background:#fcc;"
| 3
| April 25
| Miami
| 
| Brandon Jennings & Larry Sanders (16)
| Larry Sanders (11)
| Brandon Jennings (8)
| BMO Harris Bradley Center18,165
| 0-3
|- style="background:#fcc;"
| 4
| April 28
| Miami
| 
| Monta Ellis (21)
| Larry Sanders (11)
| Monta Ellis (8)
| BMO Harris Bradley Center18,717
| 0-4

Player statistics

Regular season

|- align="center" bgcolor=""
|  
| 12 || 0 || || || || || || || || ||
|- align="center" bgcolor="#f0f0f0"
| 
| 47 || 23 || || || || || || || || ||
|- align="center" bgcolor="#f0f0f0"
| 
| || || || || || || || || || ||
|- align="center" bgcolor="#f0f0f0"
| 
| || || || || || || || || || ||
|- align="center" bgcolor=""
| 
| 82 || 82 || 37.5 || || || || || || || || 19.2
|- align="center" bgcolor="#f0f0f0"
| 
| || || || || || || || || || ||
|- align="center" bgcolor=""
| 
| || || || || || || || || || ||
|- align="center" bgcolor="#f0f0f0"
|  
| || || || || || || || || || ||
|- align="center" bgcolor="#f0f0f0"
| 
| || || || || || || || || || ||
|- align="center" bgcolor="#f0f0f0"
| 
| 80 || 80 || || || || || || || || ||
|- align="center" bgcolor="#f0f0f0"
| 
| || || || || || || || || || ||
|- align="center" bgcolor="#f0f0f0"
| 
| || || || || || || || || || ||
|- align="center" bgcolor=""
|  
| || || || || || || || || || ||
|- align="center" bgcolor=""
| 
| || || || || || || || || || ||
|- align="center" bgcolor="#f0f0f0"
| 
| || || || || || || || || || ||
|- align="center" bgcolor=""
|  
| || || || || || || || || || ||
|}
  Statistics with the Milwaukee Bucks.

Playoffs

|- align="center" bgcolor=""
| 
| || || || || || || || || || ||
|- align="center" bgcolor="#f0f0f0"
| 
| || || || || || || || || || ||
|- align="center" bgcolor=""
| 
| || || || || || || || || || ||
|- align="center" bgcolor="#f0f0f0"
| 
| || || || || || || || || || ||
|- align="center" bgcolor=""
| 
| || || || || || || || || || ||
|- align="center" bgcolor="#f0f0f0"
| 
| || || || || || || || || || ||
|- align="center" bgcolor="#f0f0f0"
| 
| || || || || || || || || || ||
|- align="center" bgcolor="#f0f0f0"
| 
| || || || || || || || || || ||
|- align="center" bgcolor=""
| 
| || || || || || || || || || ||
|- align="center" bgcolor=""
| 
| || || || || || || || || || ||
|- align="center" bgcolor="#f0f0f0"
| 
| || || || || || || || || || ||
|}

Awards and records

Transactions

Overview

Trades

Free agents

See also
 2012–13 NBA season

References

Milwaukee Bucks seasons
Milwaukee
Milwaukee Bucks
Milwaukee Bucks